Yaji may refer to the following people.

Yaji I, a Hausa king (reign: 1349-1385)
Yaji II, a Hausa king (reign: 1753-1768)